Richland County Courthouse may refer to:
 Richland County Courthouse (Illinois)
 Richland County Courthouse (North Dakota)
 Richland County Courthouse (Ohio)